Shipov (from шип meaning thorn) is a Russian masculine surname having a feminine counterpart called Shipova. It may refer to:
Dmitry Shipov (1851–1920), Russian politician;
Ivan Shipov (1865–1919), Russian politician;
Maxim Shipov (born 1987), Russian-Israeli figure skater; and
Sergei Shipov (born 1966), Russian chess grandmaster.

Russian-language surnames